The El Gouna International 2014 is the men's edition of the 2014 El Gouna International, which is a PSA World Series event Gold (Prize money : 115 000 $). The event took place at the Abu Tig Marina in El Gouna in Egypt from 13 April to 18 April. Ramy Ashour won his second El Gouna International trophy, beating Mohamed El Shorbagy in the final.

Prize money and ranking points
For 2014, the prize purse was $115,000. The prize money and points breakdown is as follows:

Seeds

Draw and results

See also
El Gouna International
PSA World Series 2014

References

External links
PSA El Gouna International 2014 website
El Gouna International 2014 official website

Squash tournaments in Egypt
Men's El Gouna International
Men's El Gouna International